Javiera Alejandra Toro Cáceres (born 10 October 1987) is a Chilean politician and lawyer who currently serves as Minister of National Assets.

References

External links
 

1987 births
Living people
University of Chile alumni
21st-century Chilean politicians
Izquierda Autónoma politicians
Commons (political party) politicians
Government ministers of Chile
Women government ministers of Chile